Annamalai Ramanathan (29 August 1946 – 12 March 1993) was an Indian mathematician in the field of algebraic geometry, who introduced the notion of Frobenius splitting of algebraic varieties jointly with Vikram Bhagvandas Mehta in . The notion of Frobenius splitting led to the solution of many classical problems, in particular a proof of the Demazure character formula and results on the equations defining Schubert varieties in general flag manifolds.

Research career
Ramanathan got his B.Sc in Mathematics at Ramakrishna Mission Vivekananda College, and was recruited to attend TIFR, where he got his Ph.D. in Mathematics in 1976. His thesis on moduli for principal bundles was published in 1996 in two papers in Proc. Indian Acad. Sci. three years after his death.

Ramanathan, was a Professor of Mathematics at the TIFR in Bombay, India. He has also been employed at University of Bonn, Johns Hopkins University and University of Illinois at Urbana-Champaign.  Ramanathan made significant contributions to many areas of mathematics, including moduli of vector bundles, Gauge theory, algebraic geometry in positive characteristic and representation theory.

Awards
The Council of Scientific and Industrial Research awarded he and his collaborator Vikram Bhagvandas Mehta the Shanti Swarup Bhatnagar Prize for Science and Technology (the Indian Presidential award for achievement in the mathematical sciences) in 1991 for his work in algebraic geometry.

Personal life
Ramanathan was third of four children born to a Tamil family S. RM. CT. Annamalai and Lakshmi.  Ramanathan was crippled
by adult onset polio in his late teens, and he used a crutch for the rest of his life.

During his tenure as a visiting professor at University of Illinois at Urbana-Champaign, Ramanathan died in Chicago, Friday, 12 March 1993, of complications
following treatment for a heart attack. He is survived by his wife RM. Vasantha and three daughters Lakshmi Valli Priya.

Sources

External links
Annamalai Ramanathan   citation

References

20th-century Indian mathematicians
1993 deaths
1949 births
Tata Institute of Fundamental Research alumni
Recipients of the Shanti Swarup Bhatnagar Award in Mathematical Science